Piekiełko may refer to the following places:
Piekiełko, Lesser Poland Voivodeship (south Poland)
Piekiełko, Masovian Voivodeship (east-central Poland)
Piekiełko, Mława, a former village, now part of the town of Mława in Masovian Voivodeship
Piekiełko, Gmina Przodkowo in Pomeranian Voivodeship (north Poland)
Piekiełko, Gmina Sierakowice in Pomeranian Voivodeship (north Poland)